San Carlos Borromeo Church (Spanish: Iglesia Parroquial de San Carlos Borromeo), also known as Mahatao Church, is a Roman Catholic church located in Mahatao, Batan Island, Batanes, Philippines. The church's titular is Saint Charles Borromeo whose feast is celebrated every November 4. Its beauty and excellent state of preservation made it a National Cultural Treasure by the National Museum of the Philippines on July 31, 2001.

History
The town of Mahatao was first mentioned in history in 1720 with Fr. Juan Bel's report of villages in Batan Island. When Batanes became a part of the Philippines and as a consequence, a Spanish colony, Mahatao was founded as an ecclesiastical mission by the Dominicans in 1783. It was first a dependency of Basco, and placed under the advocacy of St. Bartholomew the Apostle but its patron saint and protector became St. Charles Borromeo later on, as stated in a report by Lieutenant Governor Joaquin del Castillo on May 6, 1792.

The earliest church in Mahatao was constructed in 1787. It was initially made of light materials but underwent modifications that by the time Mahatao evolved from being a visita to a vicariate under Fr. Tomas Sanchez albeit unofficially  in 1789, the first stone church in Mahatao was built.

The first church was said to be ugly so when it was partially damaged during a very strong typhoon in 1872, then Vicar Fr. Crescencio Polo saw to the reconstruction of a stronger and more artistic structure in 1873, covering the roof with cogon. Fr. Polo also remodeled the convent made of stone and mortar, which is attached to the church.

On September 19, 1898, the Katipunan revolutionaries ransacked the church. There were records that during this time, the original gold Episcopal crosier of the image of San Carlos as well as the gold jewelry pieces of the Lady of the Rosary and the Sto. Niño were stolen.

Architectural features

The church is made of stone and lime, common building materials in Batanes. An espadaña belfry is located on top of the facade's pediment with one of its bells dated 1874.
The church has uneven wall thickness due to addition of step buttresses and even buttress walls. Its interiors, decorated in Baroque style, showcase floral designs sunburst ornaments painted in polychrome and gilt which lends a golden glow among the statuary. The main retablo houses images of Saint Charles Borromeo, patron, on the center and surrounded by Saint Joseph, Saint Dominic de Guzman and Saint Rose of Lima. Two minor altar housing the image of the Our Lady of the Rosary on the right and of the Holy Child on the left of the central altar can also be found.

On the right side of the facade is the church convent. The second floor of the convent is not the typical volada or cantilevered gallery for convents in the Philippines but an open extended deck. At the back of the convent are remains of an old circular well. Located on the left side of the facade is a beacon used for navigation

References

External links

Roman Catholic churches in Batanes
National Cultural Treasures of the Philippines
Churches in the Roman Catholic Territorial Prelature of Batanes